The Strait of Tiquina is the passage that connects the larger and smaller parts of Lake Titicaca in Bolivia.

Geography
It joins the upper lake, Lake Chucuito, and the lower (and smaller) lake, Lake Wiñaymarka (or Lake Pequeño, "little lake"). The entire lake is called Lake Titicaca and is the largest lake, by volume, in South America. It is situated on the border of Bolivia and Peru.

To save the distance around Lago Pequeno, buses and cars cross the strait on barges or canoes, the passengers usually separate from the heavier vehicles. The crossing runs between the towns of San Pedro de Tiquina and San Pablo de Tiquina.

Road blockades
The road for the crossing is on occasions blockaded by local residents protesting against increases in ferry tolls and demanding a road bridge. Local residents have campaigned for a bridge to be constructed but barge operators and the Government are against the proposal.

References

Tiquina
Bodies of water of Bolivia
Lake Titicaca
Landforms of La Paz Department (Bolivia)